Igor Barukčič (born 12 November 1990) is a football midfielder from Slovenia.

References

External links
NZS profile

1990 births
Living people
Slovenian footballers
Slovenia youth international footballers
Association football midfielders
NK Ivančna Gorica players
NK Krka players
NK Radomlje players
Slovenian Second League players
Slovenian PrvaLiga players